Mindfields is the tenth studio album (though counted as the 11th album overall — see Toto XIV)  by the American rock band Toto. It was released in Europe and Japan on 3 March 1999, followed by a US release on 16 November 16. Mindfields saw the return of vocalist Bobby Kimball, who had departed the band following the 1982 album Toto IV.

Reception

The album received mixed reviews from critics. Michael Gallucci of AllMusic wrote: "Overlong, overwrought, and devoid of personality, this incredibly dull world-view update of Toto's crassly professional sound manages to pillage several cultures at once without contributing a single song worth remembering. The playing is tight—as you would expect from a bunch of studio session musicians—but all the skills in the world can't liven these 14 plodding tracks."

Track listing

1999 Release 

1 On some copies of the album, a longer version of "High Price of Hate" was used clocking in at 9:49.
2 Bonus track on North American and Japanese versions of the album.

2018 All In Remaster

Personnel 
Adapted from album's liner notes.

Toto
 Steve Lukather – guitars, lead vocals , backing vocals 
 David Paich – keyboards, horn arrangements , backing vocals , slide guitar solo , lead vocals 
 Mike Porcaro – bass guitar, cello 
 Simon Phillips  – drums, tabla , percussion , loops , backing vocals 
 Bobby Kimball – lead vocals , backing vocals 

Guest musicians
 Steve Porcaro – keyboards 
 Clint Black – harmonica and backing vocals 
 Lenny Castro – percussion 
 Jim Horn – horns 
 Tom Scott – horns , horn arrangements 
 Bill Reichenbach Jr. – horns 
 Chuck Findley – horns 
 Gary Grant – horns 
 Mark Hudson – backing vocals 
 Timothy B. Schmit – backing vocals 
 Phil Soussan – backing vocals 
 Richard Page – backing vocals 
 Chris Thompson – backing vocals 
 Maria Vidal – backing vocals

Production 
 Producers – Toto and Elliot Scheiner
 Recorded by Eric Cowden, Steve Genewick, Steve MacMillan, Charles Paakari, Elliot Scheiner, Al Schmitt, Jess Sutcliffe and Jeff Thomas.
 Mixed by Elliot Scheiner at Capitol Studios (Hollywood, CA).
 Mastered and Sequenced by Ted Jensen at Sterling Sound (New York, NY).
 Editing by Steve MacMillan
 Production Coordination – Shari Sutcliffe
 Copyist – Dan Ferguson
 Creative Director – Doug Brown

Singles 
 Melanie / Spanish Steps Of Rome

References 

Toto (band) albums
1999 albums
Neo-progressive rock albums
Albums produced by Elliot Scheiner